The  is a proposed subway line that would run between  and , ultimately extending to . The whole line will lie within the city of Kawasaki in Kanagawa Prefecture, Japan.  It would link the eastern and western parts of southern Kawasaki that are otherwise not well served by rail transport. The railway line is planned by the city government of Kawasaki, therefore the operator would be Kawasaki City Transportation Bureau, which previously ran a city tram, busway, and currently operates extensive bus services.

History
A plan for a subway through Kawasaki was first devised in the 1960s.

In 1985, the ministry changed the plan to use the existing Musashino South Line right-of-way, converting it from a freight-only to passenger-only operations. However the operator of the line, Japanese National Railways, was not favorable to the plan due to the line's importance for transporting freight, especially since the passenger-only Nambu Line was already operating nearby. The plan was therefore put on hold.

In 2001, the ministry announced plans to build the line between Shin-Yurigaoka and Kawasaki stations, erasing the eastern segment to Sangyō-Dōro present in the 1966 plan. Instead, the line would have connecting service onto the Keikyū Daishi Line.

However, in 2003, due to the weak Japanese economy, the city government postponed the subway's construction for five years. In 2005, they changed the path of the line to go through Musashi-Kosugi rather than Motosumiyoshi, to improve the line's revenue potential. The current funding has been shelved, and as of 2013 there are no concrete plans to proceed.

2005 plan

Basic data
Distance:  (Shin-Yurigaoka – Musashi-Kosugi)
Stations: 11
Gauge: 
Tracks: Entire line double-tracked
Electrification: 1500 V DC

Stations
 All stations are located in Kawasaki.
 The Express Service stops at stations marked "●", skips those marked "|". All other services stop at every station.

References
 Aihara, Kenta. A study of the Kawasaki Longitudinal Rapid Railway.

External links 
 Kawasaki City Transportation Bureau 

Rail transport in Kanagawa Prefecture
Proposed railway lines in Japan